Milton Colbert (born September 24, 1989) is an American football wide receiver who is currently a free agent. He Played College Football at Illinois State University after transferring from Michigan State University.

On May 14, 2015, Colbert signed with the Trenton Freedom.

References

External links
 Michigan State Spartans bio
 Illinois State Redbirds bio

1989 births
Living people
American football wide receivers
Illinois State Redbirds football players
Iowa Barnstormers players
Michigan State Spartans football players
Trenton Freedom players